Dam Tang or Dam-e Tang or Damtang may refer to:
 Dam Tang, Chaharmahal and Bakhtiari
 Dam Tang-e Masri
 Dam Tang Chendar Chavil
 Damtang, Bagh-e Malek, Khuzestan Province
 Dam-e Tang-e Bavary, Kohgiluyeh and Boyer-Ahmad Province
 Dam Tang-e Chahen, Kohgiluyeh and Boyer-Ahmad Province
 Dam Tang-e Darrehna, Kohgiluyeh and Boyer-Ahmad Province
 Dam Tang-e Kap, Kohgiluyeh and Boyer-Ahmad Province
 Dam Tang-e Landeh, Kohgiluyeh and Boyer-Ahmad Province
 Dam Tang-e Miyan Tangan, Kohgiluyeh and Boyer-Ahmad Province
 Dam-e Tang-e Molghun, Kohgiluyeh and Boyer-Ahmad Province
 Dam Tang-e Nal Ashkenan-e Mahtab, Kohgiluyeh and Boyer-Ahmad Province
 Dam Tang-e Orveh, Kohgiluyeh and Boyer-Ahmad Province
 Dam Tang-e Sarna, Kohgiluyeh and Boyer-Ahmad Province
 Dam-e Tang-e Shahid Deli Bajak, Kohgiluyeh and Boyer-Ahmad Province
 Dam Tang-e Sheykh Sorkeh, Kohgiluyeh and Boyer-Ahmad Province
 Dam Tang-e Sulak, Kohgiluyeh and Boyer-Ahmad Province
 Dam Tang-e Tikab, Kohgiluyeh and Boyer-Ahmad Province